The 2014 United States Senate election in West Virginia was held on November 4, 2014, to elect a member of the United States Senate to represent the State of West Virginia, concurrently with other elections to the United States Senate in other states and elections to the United States House of Representatives and various state and local elections.

Incumbent Democratic senator Jay Rockefeller decided to retire rather than run for reelection for a sixth term. The Democrats nominated Secretary of State of West Virginia Natalie Tennant and the Republicans nominated U.S. Representative Shelley Moore Capito. It was the thirteenth U.S. Senate election that involved two major party female nominees in U.S. history.

Capito defeated Tennant and became the first female senator elected in West Virginia's history as well as the first Republican elected to the Senate from West Virginia since 1956, as their first non-special election victory since 1942. The results of this election were a near complete flip from 2008, in which Democrat Jay Rockefeller received 64% of the vote. This was the first open-seat non-special election since 1984.

Democratic primary

Candidates

Declared
 Dennis Melton
 Natalie Tennant, Secretary of State of West Virginia and candidate for governor in 2011
 David Wamsley, developer

Withdrew
 Sheirl Fletcher, former Republican State Delegate and candidate for the U.S. Senate in 2008, 2010 and 2012

Declined
 Ralph Baxter, attorney and CEO of Orrick, Herrington & Sutcliffe
 Gaston Caperton, former Governor
 Mike Callaghan, former Assistant United States Attorney and former chairman of the West Virginia Democratic Party
 Nick Casey, former chairman of the West Virginia Democratic Party (running for the U.S. House)
 Robin Davis, Justice for the Supreme Court of Appeals of West Virginia
 Glen Gainer III, West Virginia State Auditor (running for WV-01)
 Booth Goodwin, United States Attorney for the Southern District of West Virginia
 Carte Goodwin, former U.S. Senator
 Walt Helmick, West Virginia Agriculture Commissioner
 Jim Humphreys, former state senator and nominee for West Virginia's 2nd congressional district in 2000 and 2002
 Jeff Kessler, President of the West Virginia Senate and candidate for governor in 2011
 Corey Palumbo, state senator
 Nick Preservati, attorney
 John Perdue, West Virginia State Treasurer and candidate for governor in 2011
 Nick Rahall, U.S. Representative
 Jay Rockefeller, incumbent U.S. Senator
 Allen Tackett, former Adjutant General of the West Virginia National Guard
 Rick Thompson, West Virginia Secretary of Veterans Affairs, former Speaker of the West Virginia House of Delegates and candidate for governor in 2011
 Earl Ray Tomblin, Governor of West Virginia
 Erik Wells, state senator
 Bob Wise, former Governor

Endorsements

Polling

Results

Republican primary

Candidates

Declared
 Larry Butcher
 Shelley Moore Capito, U.S. Representative
 Matthew Dodrill

Withdrew
 Rick LeMasters, retired Marine officer and state employee
 Pat McGeehan, former state delegate and former Air Force Intelligence Officer and Captain (running for House of Delegates)
 Scott Regan, Democratic candidate for the state senate in 2010
 Edwin Vanover, former Bramwell Police Chief and Democratic candidate for the House of Delegates in 2012

Declined
 Bill Maloney, businessman and nominee for Governor in 2011 and 2012
 David McKinley, U.S. Representative
 Patrick Morrisey, Attorney General of West Virginia
 John Raese, businessman, nominee for the U.S. Senate in 1984, 2006, 2010 and 2012 and candidate for governor in 1988

Endorsements

Polling

Results

Independents and third parties

Candidates

Declared
 Bob Henry Baber (Mountain Party), writer, former mayor of Richwood, nominee for Governor of West Virginia in 2011 and nominee for the U.S. Senate in 2012
 John Buckley (Libertarian Party), attorney, retired law clerk, former Virginia state delegate, and cousin of William F. Buckley, Jr.
 Phil Hudok (Constitution Party), nominee for West Virginia's 2nd congressional district in 2010

Withdrawn
 Martin Staunton (Independent), former TV anchor (moved to Georgia)

General election

Debates
A televised debate between Tennant and Capito was held on October 7 in Charleston.
 Complete video of debate

Predictions

Polling

With Davis

With Fletcher

With Goodwin

With Rahall

With Rockefeller

With Tennant

Results

See also
 2014 United States Senate elections
 2014 United States elections

References

External links
 U.S. Senate elections in West Virginia, 2014 at Ballotpedia
 Campaign contributions at OpenSecrets
Official campaign websites (Archived)
 Shelley Moore Capito for U.S. Senate -Republican
 Natalie Tennant for U.S. Senate - Democrat
 Phil Hudok for U.S. Senate - Constitution

West Virginia
2014
United States Senate